Joseph Denis Irwin (born 31 October 1965) is an Irish former professional footballer and sports television presenter.

As a player, he played as a full-back from 1983 to 2004. Irwin is best known for his long and successful stint at Manchester United, where he established himself as one of the most important players in the United team that won a host of domestic and European trophies in his time there between 1990 and 2002. He has been regarded by Alex Ferguson as, pound for pound, his greatest ever signing. Earlier in his career he played for Leeds United and then Oldham Athletic, and finished his career with a two-year spell at Wolverhampton Wanderers, the club he supported as a child.

Irwin was capped by the Republic of Ireland national side 56 times, scoring four goals and featuring in the side that reached the second round (last 16) at the 1994 FIFA World Cup. Irwin is the joint most successful Irish footballer in history, a record he shares with fellow Manchester United stalwart Roy Keane, having won 19 trophies in his career.

Early life
Irwin was born and raised in Cork, County Cork and was educated at Togher Boys' National School and Coláiste Chríost Rí. As a schoolboy, he excelled at both Gaelic football and hurling, and played at Croke Park more than once, on one occasion marking future teammate, Niall Quinn.

Club career

Irwin began his career with Leeds United in 1983, making 72 appearances in the Second Division, before moving on to Oldham Athletic on a free transfer in 1986. He helped Oldham reach the semi-finals of the FA Cup and the final of the League Cup in 1990 before he was transferred to Manchester United for a fee of £625,000.

In 12 years at Old Trafford, he made 296 Premier League appearances and won seven Premier League title medals, as well as two FA Cup winner's medals (1994 and 1996), a League Cup winner's medal and UEFA Champions League and European Cup Winners' Cup honours. He was comfortable in either of the full back positions and an expert at free kicks and penalties, and even in his mid thirties he was still United's first choice left-back in preference to the much younger Phil Neville.

He scored a total of 22 league goals for Manchester United, including several penalties. The first of these came on 7 September 1991 in a 3–0 home win over Norwich City in the First Division.

Notable goals came on 26 December 1991, when he scored twice in a 6–3 away league win over his old club Oldham Athletic, and his late winner against Southampton in May 1995 which kept the league title race open until the final match.

Irwin was awarded a testimonial match for Manchester United – played on 16 August 2000 against Manchester City at Old Trafford. Despite testimonials being friendly matches, due to the match being between local rivals it was a physical affair. Irwin went off injured in the 37th minute after a bad challenge by City striker George Weah.

Irwin made his last appearance for Manchester United at Old Trafford against Charlton Athletic on the final day of the 2001–02 Premier League season (12 May 2002), which ended in a 0–0 draw. For his final appearance as a Manchester United player, Alex Ferguson awarded him the captain's armband.

Irwin joined Wolverhampton Wanderers on a free transfer after the 2001–02 season, coincidentally joining the Black Country club at the same time as his former Manchester United teammate Paul Ince made the move to the West Midlands club, having previously been at Middlesbrough. Irwin scored twice in his first season at Wolves, against Burnley and Grimsby.

After Wolves won promotion to the Premier League in 2003, Irwin was applauded by the Manchester United supporters when he walked onto the pitch at Old Trafford for an early season league match which United won 1–0.

Wolves were relegated at the end of the 2003–04 season, and the 38-year-old Irwin then announced his retirement.

International career
Irwin played for the Republic of Ireland national under-19 team that qualified for the 1983 UEFA European Under-18 Championship and the 1984 UEFA European Under-18 Championship. He was capped 56 times for the Republic of Ireland between 1990 and 1999, and scored four goals. His first appearance came on 12 September 1990 (just after his move to Manchester United), when he helped them beat Morocco 1–0 in a friendly at Dalymount Park. He made his competitive international debut on 17 October 1990, when the national side began their UEFA Euro 1992 qualifying campaign with a 5–0 win over Turkey at Lansdowne Road. He scored his first international goal on 29 April 1992 in a friendly against the United States at Lansdowne Road. His final international appearance came on 17 November 1999, at the age of 34, when Ireland lost to Turkey in the UEFA Euro 2000 qualifying play-off second leg in Bursa. He played for his country at the 1994 World Cup.

Media career
Since 2004, Irwin has worked as a presenter on MUTV. Irwin has been involved in coverage of several football tournaments on RTÉ. He is also a columnist with Ireland's Sunday World newspaper. He contributed to RTÉ Sport's coverage of the 2010 FIFA World Cup.

Career statistics

Club

International

Republic of Ireland score listed first, score column indicates score after each Irwin goal.

Honours
Oldham Athletic
Football League Cup runner-up: 1989–90

Manchester United
Premier League: 1992–93, 1993–94, 1995–96, 1996–97, 1998–99, 1999–2000, 2000–01
FA Cup: 1993–94, 1995–96; runner-up: 1994–95
Football League Cup: 1991–92; runner-up: 1990–91, 1993–94
FA Charity Shield: 1990 (shared), 1993, 1996, 1997
UEFA Champions League: 1998–99
European Cup Winners' Cup: 1990–91
European Super Cup: 1991
Intercontinental Cup: 1999

Wolverhampton Wanderers
Football League First Division play-offs: 2003

Individual
PFA Team of the Year: 1989–90 Second Division, 1993–94 Premier League, 1998–99 Premier League, 2002–03 First Division
Overall Team of the Decade – Premier League 10 Seasons Awards (1992/3 – 2001/2)
PFA Team of the Century (1997–2007): 2007
English Football Hall of Fame: 2016

References

External links

Biography at ManUtd.com

1965 births
Living people
Association footballers from Cork (city)
Republic of Ireland association footballers
Association football defenders
People educated at Coláiste Chríost Rí
Leeds United F.C. players
Oldham Athletic A.F.C. players
Manchester United F.C. players
Wolverhampton Wanderers F.C. players
Premier League players
English Football League players
UEFA Champions League winning players
English Football Hall of Fame inductees
Republic of Ireland youth international footballers
Republic of Ireland under-21 international footballers
Republic of Ireland under-23 international footballers
Republic of Ireland B international footballers
Republic of Ireland international footballers
1994 FIFA World Cup players
Republic of Ireland expatriate association footballers
Irish expatriate sportspeople in England
Expatriate footballers in England
Irish columnists
Irish sportswriters
FA Cup Final players